"River Song" is a song written by Dennis Wilson and his younger brother Carl Wilson. It served as the opening track for Dennis Wilson's 1977 debut solo album Pacific Ocean Blue. The song was released as a single in Europe with the B-side being "Farewell My Friend". The single however, failed to chart. The track, as with the rest of the album, was credited as being produced by Dennis and his close friend Gregg Jakobson. Dennis Wilson sings the lead vocals on this and every other track on the album.

Recording
All the keyboards featured in the song were provided by Dennis Wilson. The opening piano part of the song had origins seven years earlier during recording sessions held in 1970. The piano riff represents the flowing of a river. In an interview, Dennis explained that he was "in the High Sierras walking by this river that was very small and it kept getting bigger and bigger", and he explains that this is the purpose — to represent the river — of "the guitar sound on the track" The music, according to Dennis, "came from the river".

The Beach Boys version
The Beach Boys performed the song live in the early 1970s and had attempted to record the song, but their version was left unfinished. The band then used Dennis Wilson's solo version for their 1981 two-disc greatest hits collection, Ten Years of Harmony.

Personnel
Credits from Craig Slowinski.
 Dennis Wilson – lead vocals, harmony and backing vocals, bass vocals, piano, Minimoog synthesizer, producer, arrangements, choral vocal arrangements
 Carl Wilson – harmony and backing vocals, lead/rhythm guitar
 Billy Hinsche – harmony and backing vocals, bass vocals, lead/rhythm guitar
 Ed Carter – bass
 Ricky Fataar – drums
 Ed Tuleja – bass vocals
 Gregg Jakobson – bass vocals, producer
 The Double Rock Baptist Church Voices of Inspiration Choir – choral vocals
 Alexander Hamilton – bass vocals, choral vocal arrangements, choir conductor

References

Songs about rivers
1977 singles
Dennis Wilson songs
Songs written by Carl Wilson
Songs written by Dennis Wilson
Song recordings produced by Dennis Wilson
1970 songs